The 2015 NNSW FFA Cup qualifying rounds and Finals series was a knockout competition run in Northern New South Wales, by Northern NSW Football, used to determine the two Northern NSW entrants to the national 2015 FFA Cup.  For the Preliminary rounds, Football Far North Coast kicked off the overall competition with matches on 13 February.

Format
Due to travel distances and time restraints, the competition was divided into two pools, the Northern Pool and the Southern Pool.

Northern Pool

The four Northern Pool Zones play off within their respective district-based zones. The Zone winners then played off for two places in the Quarter-finals stage of the preliminary round.

First round

Football Mid North Coast

Northern Inland Football

North Coast Football

Byes: Urunga FC (-)

Football Far North Coast

Second round

Football Mid North Coast

Northern Inland Football

Byes: Northern Inland Winner Match 5

North Coast Football

Byes: North Coast Winner Match 4

Football Far North Coast

Byes: Alstonville FC (2)

Third round

Football Mid North Coast

Byes: Tuncurry Forster FC (4)

Northern Inland Football

Byes: Northern Inland Winner Round 2 Match 2

North Coast Football

Byes: North Coast Winner Round 2 Match 2 (Unless Urunga FC win as they have already had a bye)

Football Far North Coast

Fourth round

Football Mid North Coast

Byes: Tuncurry Forster FC (4)

Northern Inland Football

North Coast Football

Football Far North Coast

Byes: Football Far North Coast Round 3 Winner Match 1

Fifth round

Football Mid North Coast vs Northern Inland Football

North Coast Football vs Football Far North Coast

Southern Pool

Second round

 Byes : Jesmond FC (5)

Third round
The winners from the second round played the seeded NNSW NPL teams. The second round took place on the weekend of 28 February - 1 March 2015.

Fourth round

 Byes : 1 x Division 1 or Zone League Team.

Fifth round
The draw will most likely be as follows:

 Byes : 3-4 x Division 1 or Zone League Teams will be given byes in preference to NPL teams. Depending on who prevails, up to 1 x NPL team may be given a bye.

NNSW Finals

The NNSW Football Finals series will take place on the weekend of 20–21 June 2015. The finals will be composed of:
 2 teams from the Northern Pool
 3 teams from the NPL Southern Pool
 3 teams from the Division 1 and Zone Southern Pool.

Quarter-finals
The Quarter-finals took place at the Lake Macquarie Regional Football Facility on 20 June 2015.

Semi-finals
The Semi-finals took place at the Lake Macquarie Regional Football Facility on 21 June 2015.

References

External links

FFA Cup
Soccer cup competitions in Australia